Old Faithful is a geyser within Yellowstone National Park.

Old Faithful may also refer to:
 Old Faithful (film), a 1935 film
 "Old Faithful" (rugby league song)
 "Old Faithful" (Hope & Faith episode)
 "Old Faithful", a 1934 short story by Raymond Z. Gallun
 "Old Faithful", a 1955 story from The Railway Series book Four Little Engines
 Old Faithful, Graeme Obree's bicycle

See also
 Old Faithful Historic District, a historic district in Yellowstone National Park
 Old Faithful Inn, a hotel in Yellowstone National Park
 Old Faithful of California, a geyser near Calistoga, California